The Communist Youth Movement (CJB) is a political youth organisation in the Netherlands. The CJB was founded on 21 September 2003, as an independent continuation of the youth of the New Communist Party of the Netherlands,  (NCPN Youth). It is the official youth organisation of the NCPN and publishes  (Onwards!), an online magazine.

Organization 
The CJB in organized in different regions and chapters. The highest membership body is the general meeting, which is held once every two years. The movement is organized along the lines of democratic centralism. Chapters are active in North Holland, Overijssel, West Brabant, South Holland and Groningen. There are also members throughout the country who are not part of a chapter.

The CJB is an autonomous youth organisation, but is aligned with the NCPN politically. The CJB permits only dual membership of the NCPN and not of other political parties. Exceptions are possible, such as CJB members  who are abroad joining their local communist organization, or members with an immigrant background joining a communist party which is active in their diaspora (for instance Chile, Greece or Iraq).

Political Activities 
The main goal of the CJB is raising class consciousness and emancipation of young people from the workers and unemployed class in the Netherlands. Its members are active in anti-fascist movements, the student movement and as organizers in the labor movement.

The CJB participates in the yearly Labor Day demonstrations organized by the FNV and the demonstration on the International Day for the Elimination of Racial Discrimination.

The movement also organizes an alternative remembrance of the February Strike. In contrast to the official remembrance, the remembrance of the CJB specifically celebrates the communist ideology of the strikers.

International 
The CJB participates in the Meeting of European Communist Youth Organizations (MECYO) and is a member of the World Federation of Democratic Youth (WFDY).. The movement regularly organizes actions in solidarity with Cuba.

See also 
 Algemeen Nederlands Jeugd Verbond ( the youth organization of the CPN and a predecessor of the CJB)
 New Communist Party of the Netherlands

References

External links 
 English CJB website
 Voorwaarts!, webmagazine of the CJB
 De terugkeer van Marx: Het profiel van de NCPN Communisme als levenshouding (in Dutch). A profile in De Groene Amsterdammer of the CJB and NCPN

Youth wings of communist parties
Youth wings of political parties in the Netherlands